Andrew Braddock (born 1978) is a member of the unicameral Australian Capital Territory Legislative Assembly representing the multi-member electorate of Yerrabi since 2020 for the ACT Greens.

Early life, Education and career before politics 
Braddock graduated from Griffith University with a Bachelor of Environmental Engineering (Honours) and moved to Canberra in 2002 to join the Public Service.  He went on to obtain a Masters of Management Studies from the University of New South Wales.

Braddock was a public servant and environmental engineer.

Political career 
Braddock stood for election to the ACT Legislative Assembly at the 2016 ACT Election as a candidate for the ACT Greens in the new electorate of Yerrabi. The Greens were unsuccessful in winning a seat in Yerrabi obtaining 7.1 per cent of the vote. In 2019 he ran for The Greens in the Federal election for the Seat of Fenner where he obtained 14.42 per cent of the vote, a swing to The Greens of 1.42 per cent. Braddock stood as the ACT Greens lead candidate for Yerrabi for 2020 ACT election and secured a seat with primary vote of 10.2 per cent (a swing to the Greens of 3.1%).

Parliamentary career 
Braddock is the ACT Greens Party Whip and ACT Greens spokesperson for Multicultural Affairs, Better Neighbourhoods, Democracy, Integrity and Community Engagement, Police and Emergency Services, Corrections, Workplace Safety and Industrial Relations.

References 

1978 births
Living people
Members of the Australian Capital Territory Legislative Assembly
Australian Greens members of the Australian Capital Territory Legislative Assembly
21st-century Australian politicians